Fawley Power Station was an oil-fired power station located on the western side of Southampton Water, between the villages of Fawley and Calshot in Hampshire, England. Its  chimney was a prominent (and navigationally useful) landmark, but it was not, as is sometimes claimed, the highest point in Hampshire (which is Pilot Hill).

Overview
The station, which in its final years was owned and operated by Npower, was oil-fired, powered by heavy fuel oil. Pipelines connected the station to the nearby Fawley oil refinery. There were two 10-inch (25 cm) diameter, 3.2 km long, pipelines which discharged into storage tanks with a capacity of 24,000 tonnes. Because oil is more expensive than other fuels such as coal and natural gas, Fawley did not operate continuously, but came on line at times of high demand.

It was also connected to the National Grid with circuits going to Nursling and a tunnel under Southampton Water to Chilling then to Lovedean with a local substation at Botley Wood.

A dock was included in the construction, to allow for the delivery of oil by sea; however, after one ship delivery (essentially a trial) this facility remained disused.

History
Fawley was built by Mitchell Construction Architect Colin Morse RIBA for the CEGB between 1965 and 1969. It was commissioned in 1971 as a 2,000-megawatt (MW) power station, with four 500 MW generating units, each consisting of a boiler supplying steam to a turbine that powers an associated generator. 

The boilers were capable of delivering 1788.0 kg/s of steam at 158.6 bar and 538 °C. The cooling pumps were Britain's largest with a flow of 210,000 GPM. One was driven by an experimental super-conducting electric motor. 

In 1978/79 Fawley was presented with the Hinton Cup, the CEGB's "good house keeping trophy". The award was commissioned by Sir Christopher Hinton, the first chairman of the C.E.G.B. It was the first time that a C.E.G.B region (South West) had won both the Hinton Trophy and Hinton Cup. The cup going to the Solent transmission district. 
The operating data for the main plant is shown in the table:

The electricity output, in GWh, is shown graphically:The high output in 1984/5 as associated with the 1984/5 Miners' Strike, and the shortage of coal for coal-fired power stations. There were also 4 × 17.5 MW auxiliary gas turbine generators on the Fawley site giving a total output of 70 MW, these machines had been commissioned in September 1969.

Two units were mothballed in 1995, leaving the station with a capacity of only 1,000 MW.

Proposed Fawley B station
CEGB plans for a coal-fired Fawley B station were not pursued following privatisation of the industry in the late 1980s.

Closure
On 18 September 2012, RWE npower announced they would be shutting down Fawley power station by the end of March 2013, due to the EU Large Combustion Plant Directive. The power station was duly shut on 31 March 2013 after more than 40 years in operation.

Impact on wildlife
When the plant was operating the screens on the plants cooling water lines were found to kill as many as 50,000 fish a week. By the 80s intermittent plant operation meant that the annual kill total was around 200,000. While this may have resulted in reduced numbers of some species such as bass others like sand smelt seemed unaffected.

Use in media

The unique round structure housing the control room for the station was used to represent the "World Control Center" building depicted in the 1975 movie Rollerball.

Some scenes for the 2015 movie Mission: Impossible – Rogue Nation were filmed on location at Fawley power station.

The second series of British medical comedy Green Wing featured a scene that was shot in the control room.

In the Red Dwarf (series XI) the episode "Give and Take" had a scene that was filmed inside the control room.

The 2017 Channel 4 programme Spies filmed at the station and inside the control room.

The final episode Harvest of series 4 of Endeavour used the power station and control room.

The exterior of the power station was used as a filming location for the Star Wars film Solo: A Star Wars Story.

The location was used as the extraction point for the 2018 series of Celebrity Hunted. The successful fugitives escaped by speedboat, exiting into Southampton Water.

Demolition and regeneration
In 2017 it was announced that the power station site would be turned into over 1,500 homes. The project went on display to the public on 27 September 2017.

In June 2019, it was announced that the station would be demolished in several stages. The first stage took place on 3 October 2019, with a controlled explosion of the turbine hall. The southern section of the boiler house was demolished on 19 November 2020. Demolition continued on 29 July 2021 with a further controlled explosion of the stations auxiliary buildings. The chimney and remaining southern end of the turbine hall were demolished simultaneously at 7am on 31 October 2021. In February 2023, demolish work began on the control building.

See also

Marchwood Power Station

References

Power stations in South East England
Demolished power stations in the United Kingdom
Former oil-fired power stations
Former power stations in England
Buildings and structures in Hampshire
Energy infrastructure completed in 1971
Buildings and structures demolished in 2021
1971 establishments in England
2013 disestablishments in England